The following is the complete bibliography of John Updike (March 18, 1932 – January 27, 2009), an American novelist, poet, critic and essayist noted for his prolific output over a 50-year period. His bibliography includes some 23 novels, 18 short story collections, 12 collections of poetry, 4 children's books, and 12 collections of non-fiction.

Chronological listing
Novels are highlighted in bold.

Library of America editions
After publishing the essay "Hub Fans Bid Kid Adieu" as a standalone special edition book in 2010, and publishing two volumes of short stories in 2013 (available also as a boxed set), Library of America began a multi-volume edition of John Updike's novels in 2018, all under the editorship of Christopher Carduff.

See also
Alfred A. Knopf
Bibliography of Philip Roth
The New Yorker

References

Further reading
Broomfield, Michael and de Bellis, Jack, John Updike: A Bibliography of Primary and Secondary Materials, 1948-2007, Oak Knoll Press, New Castle, Delaware, 2007.
 Begley, Adam, Updike, Harper-Collins Publishers, New York, NY, 2014.

External links
A Revised Cumulative Updike Publications Bibliography 1997-2009--Books, Short Stories, Articles, Reviews, and Poems, The Centaurian Updike Homepage
Books by John Updike
 
New York Review of Books Updike archive (complete)
New Yorker archive

Bibliographies by writer
Bibliographies of American writers
Poetry bibliographies